Imperial Noble Consort Gongsu (20 September 1857 – 14 April 1921), of the Manchu Bordered Yellow Banner Arute (阿鲁特) clan, was a consort of the Tongzhi Emperor. She was one year his junior.

Life

Family background
Imperial Noble Consort Gongsu's personal name was not recorded in history. Her family originally belonged to the Mongol Plain Blue Banner.

 Father: Saišangga (1794–1875), served as the Minister of Works from 1841–1845
 Paternal grandfather: Jinghui (景辉)
 Paternal grandmother: Lady Zhang (张氏)
 Mother: Lady Fuca
 Maternal grandfather: Xingfu (兴福)
 Four brothers
 Third elder brother: Chongqi (1829–1900), the top candidate in the 1865 imperial examination, served as a fourth rank literary official in the Hanlin Academy, the Minister of Revenue from 1884–1886 and in 1900 and the Minister of Personnel in 1886, and held the title of a third class duke, the father of Empress Xiaozheyi (1854–1875)

Xianfeng era
The future Imperial Noble Consort Gongsu was born on the third day of the eighth lunar month in the seventh year of the reign of the Xianfeng Emperor, which translates to 20 September 1857 in the Gregorian calendar.

Tongzhi era
In November 1872, Lady Arute entered the Forbidden City and was granted the title "Concubine Xun" by the Tongzhi Emperor. On 23 December 1874, she was elevated to "Consort Xun". Her residence in the Forbidden city was Palace of Great Benevolence.

Guangxu era
The Tongzhi Emperor died on 12 January 1875 and was succeeded by his cousin Zaitian, who was enthroned as the Guangxu Emperor. On 29 May 1895, Lady Arute was elevated to "Noble Consort Xun".

Xuantong era
The Guangxu Emperor died on 14 November 1908 and was succeeded by his nephew Puyi, who was enthroned as the Xuantong Emperor. On 18 November 1908, Lady Arute was elevated to "Dowager Imperial Noble Consort Xun". She moved to Chuxiu Palace (儲秀宮/储秀宫) in the western part of the Forbidden City.

Republican era

After the fall of the Qing dynasty in 1912, Puyi and the imperial clan were allowed to retain their noble titles and continue living in the Forbidden City. On 12 March 1913, Puyi honoured Lady Arute with the title "Dowager Imperial Noble Consort Zhuanghe".

Lady Arute died of illness on 14 April 1921 and was posthumously honoured as "Imperial Noble Consort Gongsu". She was interred in the Hui Mausoleum of the Eastern Qing tombs.

Titles
 During the reign of the Xianfeng Emperor (r. 1850–1861):
 Lady Arute (from 20 September 1857)
 During the reign of the Tongzhi Emperor (r. 1861–1875):
 Concubine Xun (from November 1872), fifth rank consort
 Consort Xun (from 23 December 1874), fourth rank consort
 During the reign of the Guangxu Emperor (r. 1875–1908):
 Noble Consort Xun (from 29 May 1895), third rank consort
 During the reign of the Xuantong Emperor (r. 1908–1912):
 Imperial Noble Consort Xun (from 18 November 1908), second rank consort
 During the years of the Republic of China (1912–1949):
 Imperial Noble Consort Zhuanghe (from 12 March 1913)
 Imperial Noble Consort Gongsu (from 1921)

See also
 Ranks of imperial consorts in China#Qing
 Royal and noble ranks of the Qing dynasty

Notes

References
 

1857 births
1921 deaths
Qing dynasty imperial consorts
19th-century Mongolian women
Mongolian Bordered Blue Bannermen
Consorts of the Tongzhi Emperor